Tsenovo (also transliterated Cenovo or Tzenovo) may refer to two Bulgarian villages:

 Tsenovo, Ruse Province – a village in Tsenovo Municipality, Ruse Province
 Tsenovo, Stara Zagora Province – a village in Chirpan Municipality, Stara Zagora Province